2nd Aurel Awards

Producer Forza 

Broadcaster Markíza 

Lifetime Achievement Marián Varga

◄ 1st │ 3rd ►

The 2nd Aurel Awards, honoring the best in the Slovak music industry for individual achievements for the year of 2002, took time and place on March 7, 2003, at the Istropolis in Bratislava.

Winners

Main categories

Others

References

External links
 Academy of Popular Music (APH) > Members (at IFPI.sk)
 Aurel Awards > 2002 Nominees (at IFPI.sk)
 Aurel Awards > 2002 Winners (at IFPI.sk)

2
Aurel Awards
2003 music awards